2007–2011 is an compilation album by P.S. Eliot released in 2016 on Don Giovanni Records. It compiles every song recorded and released by the band during their time together along with previously unreleased demo versions.

Pitchfork named the collection Best New Reissue.

Track listing

Disc One
 Tennessee
 we'd never agree
 hail mary
 incoherent love songs
 augustus
 like how you are
 tangible romance
 tonight
 the cyborg
 zoroaster
 sore subject
 troubled medium
 talk
 cross eyed
 sadie
 asphalt
 pink sheets
 untitled
 shitty & tragic
 jesus christ
 peach
 diana
 dead letters
 mood ring
 watch on mute

Disc Two
 broken record
 cry uncle
 acid flashbacks
 dark
 bear named otis
 broken record
 entendre
 like how you are
 tonight
 troubled medium
 cross eyed (demo)
 incoherent love songs (demo)
 asphalt (demo)
 hail mary (demo)
 cry uncle (demo)
 the cyborg (demo)
 tangible romance (demo)
 jesus christ (demo)
 dead letters (demo)
 bear named otis (demo)
 untitled (demo)
 diana (demo)
 watch on mute (demo)
 sore subject (demo)
 zoroaster (demo)

References

2016 compilation albums
Don Giovanni Records albums
Punk rock compilation albums